South Range is a community in the Canadian province of Nova Scotia, located in the District of Clare in Digby County.

References
South Range on Destination Nova Scotia

Communities in Digby County, Nova Scotia
General Service Areas in Nova Scotia